Londo (Balondo) is a Bantu language of the Democratic Republic of Congo. It is closely related to Tembo.

References

Buja-Ngombe languages
Languages of the Democratic Republic of the Congo